Château Lacave is a medieval-style Castle in the city of Caxias do Sul, Rio Grande do Sul, Brazil.  The Castle functions as a winery and produces a complete line of Brazilian wines.

History
Construction of Château Lacave commenced in 1968 and was completed in 1978.  The Castle is the work of a Spaniard that wanted to construct a 6th Century Castle in the city limits of Caxias do Sul.  The Castle is constructed of basalt stone, native to the region.  The stones were cut and fitted together without the use of any type of cement in the construction.  The original owner died in 1987, and the Castle has changed owners through the years.  The Castle is currently owned by the Basso Family.

External links
 Château Lacave website  (in Portuguese)

Wineries of Brazil
Buildings and structures in Rio Grande do Sul